Grand Ole Opry is a 1940 American comedy film directed by Frank McDonald and written by Dorrell McGowan and Stuart E. McGowan. The film stars the vaudeville comedy troupe the Weaver Brothers and Elviry, with Lois Ranson, Allan Lane and Henry Kolker. The film was released on June 25, 1940, by Republic Pictures.

The story embraces neither the Grand Ole Opry building nor is it mentioned in the film: the only connection is a number of Grand Ole Opry regulars appearing in the film.

Plot

The film starts with the governor wandering into a duck hunt and getting killed.

The plot then revolves around a campaign to elect a new governor, candidates focussing upon a proposed Farmer's Bill.

The campaign speeches (and songs) are broadcast on the XYZ radio channel.

Candidates are disrupted by singing on a constant basis. Weaver proves the popular choice as he opts for Grand Ole Oprey as the music of his campaign.

Cast
Leon Weaver as Abner Weaver
Frank Weaver as silent Cicero Weaver the local policeman
June Weaver as Elviry Weaver
Lois Ranson as Susie Ann Weaver
Allan Lane as Fred Barnes
Henry Kolker as William C. Scully
John Hartley as 'Hunch' Clifton
Loretta Weaver as Violey Weaver
Purnell Pratt as Attorney General
Claire Carleton as Ginger Gordon
Ferris Taylor as Lt. Governor Edgar G. Thompson
Uncle Dave Macon as himself
Dorris Macon as himself
Roy Acuff as himself
Rachel Veach as Acuff Singer 
George D. Hay as himself

References

External links
 

1940 films
American comedy films
1940 comedy films
Republic Pictures films
Films directed by Frank McDonald
Films scored by William Lava
American black-and-white films
1940s English-language films
1940s American films